Enterolignans are organic compounds formed by the action of gut microflora on lignans.  They are thus the products of the combined action of both plants and of the animal gut. Prominent enterolignans are enterodiol and enterolactone.  Enterolignans are also called "mammalian lignans", although that term is self-contradictory since mammals do not produce lignans.

.

Enterolignans have attracted intense attention because of their potential beneficial roles in nutrition. Elevated levels of enterodiol in urine are attributed consumption of tea and other lignan-rich foods.

References

Polyols
Lignans
Phenols